The Philippine House Committee on Transportation, or House Transportation Committee is a standing committee of the Philippine House of Representatives.

Jurisdiction 
As prescribed by House Rules, the committee's jurisdiction is on land, sea, and air transportation and all public utilities and services connected thereto. This includes the establishment, operation, management, and regulation of seaports, airports, and other mass transportation systems including:
 Air transport agreements;
 Air transport security;
 Ballast water management;
 Civil aviation;
 Light and heavy rail systems and roll on - roll off systems (RO-RO);
 Maritime liens;
 Maritime security;
 Ship financing;
 Ship mortgage;
 Transportation related insurance; and
 Transportation safety standards.

Members, 18th Congress

Historical members

18th Congress

Member for the Majority 
 Francisco Datol Jr. (SENIOR CITIZENS)

See also 
 House of Representatives of the Philippines
 List of Philippine House of Representatives committees
 Department of Transportation

Notes

References

External links 
House of Representatives of the Philippines

Transportation
Transportation in the Philippines